Admiral O'Brien may refer to:

Donat Henchy O'Brien (1785–1857), British Royal Navy rear admiral
Edward O'Bryen (sometimes O'Brien) (c. 1753–1808), British Royal Navy rear admiral
James O'Brien, 3rd Marquess of Thomond (1769–1855), British Royal Navy admiral
John O'Brien (admiral) (1918–1996), Canadian Forces vice admiral
William O'Brien (Royal Navy officer) (1916–2016), British Royal Navy admiral